Renchaoxi Township is an rural township in Sangzhi County, Zhangjiajie, Hunan Province, China.

Administrative division
The township is divided into 11 villages, the following areas: Fenshuiling Village, Tongziyu Village, Yong'an Village, Xinglongping Village, Nandouxi Village, Heping Village, Hongqi Village, Taping Village, Chayewan Village, Meiziping Village, and Jinji Village (分水岭村、统子峪村、永安村、兴龙坪村、南斗溪村、和平村、红旗村、塔坪村、茶叶湾村、梅子坪村、金鸡村).

References

External links

Divisions of Sangzhi County